The M230 Cannon is a 30 mm (30×113 mm), single-barrel electrically-driven autocannon, using external electrical power (as opposed to recoil or expanding gas generated by the firing cartridge) to cycle the weapon between shots. It was designed and manufactured originally by Hughes Helicopters in Culver City, California. The company was acquired by McDonnell Douglas Helicopters in 1985, which merged into Boeing Corporation in 1997. In 2002, it was sold again to Alliant Techsystems, which merged with Orbital Sciences Corporation in 2015 to form Orbital ATK and was, in turn, bought out by Northrop Grumman in 2018. , it is produced by Northrop Grumman Innovation Systems.

Development
In 1972, Hughes Helicopters began a company-funded research effort to design a single machine gun to fire the U.S. Army's M50  round. By April 1973, the program had fired test rounds in more powerful  WECOM linked ammunition, from a prototype (A model). In January 1975 a model "C" was added, a linkless version for the proposed Advanced Attack Helicopter YAH-64; the helicopter was eventually adopted as the AH-64 Apache, with the model C as standard armament. The linked ammunition version was intended for use on the AH-1S Cobra as the M230E1, but was later dropped.

Design

Apache and DAP mounts
The M230 Chain Gun is the "Area Weapon System" on the Boeing AH-64 Apache attack helicopter and is also used on the MH-60L Direct Action Penetrator (DAP). The M230 is mounted on the chin turret. It uses a  electric motor to fire  linkless ammunition at a rate of 625±25 rounds per minute. The practical rate of fire is about 300 rounds per minute with a 10-minute cooling period as the gun is air cooled. The gun has a positive cook-off safety for open bolt clearing, and double ram prevention. Spent casings are ejected overboard through the bottom of the gun.

The mount on the AH-64 uses secondary hydraulics to move the gun. The elevation is provided via a single hydraulic actuator located on the gun's centerline just forward of the pivot point. The gun is spring-loaded to return to its centerline stowed position with the barrel angled up about eleven degrees in the event of a loss of hydraulic power. This allows the gun, which is mounted below the copilot station, to collapse cleanly into its designed space between the pilot stations in the event of a hard landing. This prevents the gun from entering the pilot's stations and becoming a hazard.

The Apache is capable of carrying up to 1,200 rounds for the gun in a device known as the 12-PAK, designed and manufactured by Meggitt Defense Systems, Inc. However, utilization by the US Army of a special internal fuel tank, the Robertson IAFS (known as the "Robby Tank" to the crews), reduces this capacity to 300 rounds. The ammunition is loaded into the AH-64D Longbow Apache by armament personnel using an aircraft-mounted motorized loader and special ammunition handling tray. The AH-64A requires specialized ground support equipment for loading.

The M230 is capable of firing the 30×113mm rounds used in the ADEN cannon and DEFA cannon, however, the Lightweight  rounds (M788, M789, M799) used in the M230 are constructed with a light alloy as opposed to brass (ADEN) or steel (DEFA) cases to save weight and are in use with the US Army. The M230 rounds are not backwards compatible with weapons designed for the ADEN or DEFA rounds. The M788 rounds can be distinguished by the blue band near the nose, the M789 by a yellow stripe atop a black band and the M799 a red stripe atop a yellow band. The M799 HEI round is not used by the US Army due to the danger of a round exploding in the gun barrel. The  M789 High Explosive Dual Purpose (HEDP) ammunition cartridge is the primary tactical round of the Apache AH-64 helicopter, widely used in current combat operations. The Apache's ability to provide accurate air support with minimal collateral damage led to increased use and volume demands for M789 ammunition.

The M789 is typically used in the M230. Each round contains  of explosive charge sealed in a shaped-charge liner. The liner collapses into an armor-piercing jet of metal that is capable of penetrating  of rolled homogeneous armour at 500m. Additionally, the shell is also designed to fragment upon impact. The lethal radius against unprotected, standing targets is about  under optimum conditions.

Variants

M230LF and MAWS
The M230LF, offered by Orbital ATK, is a more capable version of the Apache autocannon. Features include an anti-hangfire system, a delinking feeder that exploits linked ammunition, and an extended-length barrel, which results in greater muzzle velocity and hitting power from the same M789 HEDP and NATO standard  ADEN/DEFA projectiles. The chain gun can be installed in an enclosed turret on patrol boats and ground vehicles.

The MAWS (Modular Advanced Weapon System) lightweight gun system, developed in partnership with the U.S. Navy, utilizes a remotely operated M230LF in an open mount. It is controlled by a Remote Operator's Console (ROC)—with either dual grips or a joystick—from a touch panel display and extended day color TV.

In February 2015, Oshkosh Defense and ATK conducted a firing demonstration of the M230LF on an Oshkosh M-ATV MRAP to demonstrate the viability and effectiveness of a medium caliber weapon system for light tactical vehicles. The addition of the  M230LF stabilized on the RWS provides mobile precise lethality, usually reserved for heavier combat vehicles, with increased off-road mobility and MRAP levels of protection, along with optional Stinger missiles. Oshkosh has also fitted the M230LF to the L-ATV to fulfil the U.S. Army's light reconnaissance vehicle (LRV) role.

In SHORAD-use

Stryker A1 M-SHORAD

On 28 February 2018, the US Army announced that Stryker vehicles would be modified with sensors and weapons to fulfill an interim Maneuver-Short-Range Air Defense (M-SHORAD) requirement. This is in response to a capability gap identified in Europe against Russian unmanned aerial vehicles (UAVs). 
In June 2018, the Army chose Leonardo DRS to supply the mission equipment package, which partnered with Moog Inc. to integrate the Reconfigurable Integrated-weapons Platform (RIwP) onto the vehicle. The system can be fitted with a Stinger pod and Longbow Hellfire missile rails and comes equipped with a 30 mm M230LF chain gun and the 7.62 mm coaxial machine gun, as well as non-kinetic defeat capabilities and a Rada onboard multimission hemispheric radar. The Army chose DRS because of the flexibility of the reconfigurable turret to allow for growth opportunities and alternate weapon options, it posed less intrusion to the existing vehicle platform, as they have a desire to keep the Stryker as common across the fleet as possible, and it provided increased protection as the crew can reload ammunition under armor. All 144 M-SHORAD systems are planned to be delivered by 2022. The turret can mount one four-shot Stinger pod or two Hellfire missiles on either side, and reloading of the M230LF and Stingers can be done through roof hatches giving partial protection. The system can act in a secondary anti-vehicle role, as the 30 mm cannon is larger than the 25 mm gun mounted on the M2 Bradley and the Hellfire has greater range than TOW missiles typically used by ground vehicles.

MADIS
In September 2020, the US Marines contracted Kongsberg to qualify the XM914 RWS on the JLTV, equipped with an XM914E1 30 mm cannon, 7.62 mm coaxial machinegun, and Stinger missiles to fulfill an air defense role. The Marine Air Defense Integrated System (MADIS) fills the gap left by the retirement of the AN/TWQ-1 Avenger by the USMC in the mid-2000s. It consists of two JLTVs, one with the turret fitted with a 30 mm cannon, 4-round Stinger pod, and an optical sensor and the other with an RPS-42 360-degree radar, 7.62 mm M134 minigun, and EO/IR sensors; both have the Modi II dismounted electronic countermeasures system and shoulder-fired Stingers.  The indefinite delivery / indefinite quantity (IDIQ) contract was signed in October 2021.

Aircraft use
Boeing AH-64 Apache
AgustaWestland Apache
Sikorsky MH-60L Direct Action Penetrator (DAP)
CASA/IPTN CN-235

See also
M242 Bushmaster 25mm chain gun
Bushmaster II 30mm chain gun
Bushmaster III 35/50mm chain gun
Bushmaster IV 40mm chain gun

References
Notes

Bibliography

External links

Northrop Grumman M230 Chain Gun Factsheet
Northrop Grumman M230LF Chain Gun Factsheet
GlobalSecurity.org m230 Automatic Gun
M230 Automatic Gun at FAS.org

30 mm artillery
Autocannon
Aircraft guns
Alliant Techsystems
Military equipment introduced in the 1980s